Marsaskala Football Club is a Maltese football club based in the south-eastern town of Marsaskala. In season 2021-22 the club was promoted for the first time to the challenge league (formally known as division 1).

'The Beginning' 

Eager to form a sporting club, a number of Marsaskala residents, notably Daniel Spiteri, Stephen Bell, Dr Zaid Teebi, Joseph Farrugia, Albert Spiteri and Dr. Owen Bonnici, built the team from scratch.  They were later joined by Jesmond Mugliett and Dr Reuben Debono, with the latter becoming club president in the third season.

During the first season (2010–2011) the club finished second last and won the Fair Play award, while in the following season the club contracted Alan Mifsud, formerly of Zejtun Corinthians, as team manager in mid-season. The team finished in  eighth position.

Recent years 

The 2012–2013 season saw the team with a completely revamped look, players and set-up with the inclusion of Joseph Cutajar as assistant coach.  The 2012–2013 started with a 3–0 win over Victoria Hotspurs in the first round of the Maltese Trophy. Marsaskala FC went out in the fourth round against Zebbug Rangers. Marsaskala FC finished third in the league and therefore obtained promotion to the Second Division in their third season since their conception.

In November 2013, the club appointed a new coach, Louis Facciol who brought his assistant Frans Mallia. In their first four games at the helm they  brought in three victories and a draw. Nevertheless, the club was relegated on the last day of the season.

For the 2014–2015 season Marsaskala appointed Vesko Petrovic, formerly of Velez Mostar, Valletta FC and Zabbar St. Patrick as their new coach. Their aim was to consolidate their player pool base and they finished sixth. In June 2015, Petrovic was confirmed as manager for the 2015–16 season and Buttigieg was re-elected as club president.

Current squad

External links 

  (English)
 Official Facebook page (English & Maltese)
 Official Supporters page (English & Maltese)
 Official Fanzine page (English & Maltese)

Association football clubs established in 2010
Football clubs in Malta
2010 establishments in Malta
Marsaskala

https://www.mfa.com.mt/en/leagues/leagues/91/bov-amateur-league-a.htm?feature=teams&mp=190